Abdou Fall is a Senegalese boxer. He competed in the men's light welterweight event at the 1972 Summer Olympics.

References

External links
 

Year of birth missing (living people)
Living people
Senegalese male boxers
Olympic boxers of Senegal
Boxers at the 1972 Summer Olympics
Place of birth missing (living people)
Light-welterweight boxers